Walter Gassire (21 August 1946 – 19 March 2023) was a Uruguayan footballer who played as a goalkeeper. He won the Mexican Primera División with  Deportivo Toluca.

Career
Born in Florida, Gassire began playing football with the youth teams of C.A. Peñarol. He made his professional debut with Montevideo Wanderers in 1963, and two years later he moved to Defensor Sporting for six seasons.

In 1974, Gassire moved to Mexico where he spent six seasons with Deportivo Toluca, winning the league in 1974–75. He developed brain cancer while playing with Toluca in 1980. He recovered and joined Atletas Campesinos but had an injured Achilles tendon and left after six months. He next had a brief stint at Atlético Español and then finished his career at Tampico Madero in 1983.

After he retired from playing, Gassire became a football coach. He was an assistant manager with Toluca in 1986 and again with former teammate, Héctor Hugo Eugui, in 2011.

Gassire died on 19 March 2023, at the age of 76.

References

External links

1946 births
2023 deaths
Uruguayan footballers
Association football goalkeepers
Uruguayan Primera División players
Liga MX players
Peñarol players
Atlético Español footballers
Montevideo Wanderers F.C. players
Defensor Sporting players
Deportivo Toluca F.C. players
Querétaro F.C. footballers
Tampico Madero F.C. footballers
Atlético Español footballers
Uruguayan expatriate footballers
Uruguayan expatriate sportspeople in Mexico
Expatriate footballers in Mexico